Larry Ronald Kramer (April 6, 1942 – January 25, 2014) was an American football player and coach of football and baseball. He played college football at University of Nebraska–Lincoln, where he was consensus selection at tackle to the 1964 College Football All-America Team. Kramer served as the head football coach at Southern Oregon College—now known as Southern Oregon University—in Ashland, Oregon from 1970 to 1971, Austin College in Sherman, Texas from 1973 to 1982, and Emporia State University in Emporia, Kansas from 1983 to 1994, compiling career college football coaching record of 124–115–5. He led his 1981 Austin team to a share of the NAIA Division II Football National Championship.

Coaching career
After a training camp stint with the Minnesota Vikings of the National Football League (NFL), Kramer returned his alma mater, Nebraska, as an assistant coach for the freshman football team. In 1966, he was hired as an assistant football coach at McCook Junior College in McCook, Nebraska. Kramer was promoted to head coach a year later, leading to the team to a record of 18–9–3 in three seasons.

Southern Oregon
Kramer was the head football coach at Southern Oregon University in Ashland, Oregon. He held that position for the 1970 and 1971 seasons. His coaching record at Southern Oregon was 3–17.

Austin
Kramer was initially hired in May 1973 by Austin College to serve as defensive coordinator for the football team and head baseball coach. A month later, he was named head football coach, succeeding Duane Nutt, who was appointed co-assistant athletic director. Kramer was Austin's head football coach for ten seasons, from 1973 to 1982, and led the Kangaroos to a share of the NAIA Division II Football National Championship in 1981. He was named Texas Intercollegiate Athletic Association (TIAA) Coach of the Year in 1979 and 1981.

Emporia State
Kramer was the 18th head football coach for Emporia State University in Emporia, Kansas and he held that position for twelve seasons, from 1983 until 1994.  His coaching record at Emporia State was 71–54. While at Emporia State, Kramer coached future National Football League (NFL) standout Leon Lett.

Personal life
Kramer earned a bachelor's degree from the University of Nebraska–Lincoln in 1965 and a master's degree in 1966. He and his wife have four children.

Head coaching record

College football

References

External links
 Nebraska profile

1942 births
2014 deaths
All-American college football players
American football tackles
Austin Kangaroos baseball coaches
Austin Kangaroos football coaches
Emporia State Hornets football coaches
Nebraska Cornhuskers football coaches
Nebraska Cornhuskers football players
Southern Oregon Raiders football coaches
Junior college football coaches in the United States
People from Austin, Minnesota
Players of American football from Minnesota